Filippo Tancredi (1655–1722) was an Italian painter.

Biography
He was born in Messina to a minor painter and his mother, who was sister of the painter Filippo Giannetto.
1823 He trained some time in Naples, and afterwards visited Rome, where he entered the school of Carlo Maratta. He spent a great part of his life in Palermo, where he painted the ceiling of the church of the San Giuseppe dei Teatini, and that of il Gesù Nuovo. He died in Palermo.

References

1655 births
1722 deaths
17th-century Italian painters
Italian male painters
18th-century Italian painters
Painters from Messina
Italian Baroque painters
Pupils of Carlo Maratta
18th-century Italian male artists